Little Town is a hamlet in the civil parish of Above Derwent, in the Allerdale district of Cumbria, England. It is in the Workington constituency of the United Kingdom Parliament. Prior to Brexit in 2020 it was part of the North West England constituency of the European Parliament.

Little Town is in the Lake District National Park. It is in the Newlands Valley, separated from Derwent Water to the east by the summit of Catbells.

History
William Wordsworth visited this church in 1826 while on a walking tour of the fells, and that he was so impressed by his first glimpse of the church through half-opened leaves that he wrote a stanza in his poem To May.

Children's author and illustrator Beatrix Potter set The Tale of Mrs. Tiggy-Winkle (1905) in and around Little Town.

References

Hamlets in Cumbria
Allerdale